Highway 34 is a highway in the South District of Israel that begins at Yad Mordechai in the north, passes through Sderot, and ends in the south at Netivot.  Its length is 19.75 km.

Junctions & Interchanges on the highway

See also 
List of highways in Israel

34